Talon or talons may refer to:

Science and technology
 Talon (anatomy), the claw of a bird of prey
 Brodifacoum, a rodenticide, also known as the brand Talon
 TALON (database), a database maintained by the US Air Force
 Talon, an anti-vehicle-ramming spike strip-like net

Entertainment and media
 Talon, the newspaper of Los Altos High School, US
 Talon (cards), in some card games, the remainder of a deck of cards
 Talon, a novel by Julie Kagawa
 Talon (Smallville), a fictional coffee shop in the TV series
 Talon (roller coaster), an inverted roller coaster

Fictional characters
 Talons, assassins of the Court of Owls in DC Comics
 Talon, a character from Marvel Comics
 Talon, a character from Static Shock
 Talon, a character from Transformers
 Talon, a character from The Legend of Zelda
 Talon Karrde, a character from Star Wars
 Talon Maza, a character from Gargoyles
 Talon Labarthe, a character from in Ratatouille
 Achille Talon, comic book series and character
 Darth Talon, a character from Star Wars
 Talon of the Silver Hawk or Talwin Hawkins in Conclave of Shadows
 Talon, in the Dark-HunterDark-Hunter series
 X-23 or Talon, in Marvel Comics
 Talon, in the Prey video game
 Talon, in the video game Primal Rage
 Talon, a member of the Sackett family in various works by Louis L'Amour
 Talon, a dog in the film Snow Buddies
 Talon, in the TV series Inspector Gadget

Other fictional entities
 Talon light fighter in Wing Commander
 F/A-37 Talon, an aircraft in the 2005 film Stealth
 A terrorist group in the lore of Overwatch

Music
 Talon, a French term for the bow frog of a string instrument
 "Talons", a song on the Bloc Party album Intimacy
 Talons, a British band

Transportation

Ground
 Eagle Talon, an automobile produced by the Eagle division of Chrysler
 Foster-Miller TALON, a US military unmanned ground vehicle
 Talon MHS-II, a car built for the Can-Am series and used briefly in 1977

Aviation
 Lockheed MC-130 Combat Talon, a variant of the C-130 aircraft operated by the U.S. Air Force
 Northrop T-38 Talon, a US-built supersonic jet trainer for military pilots
 RotorWay A600 Talon, an American helicopter design
 Wills Wing Talon, an American hang glider design

Other uses
 Talon (actor) (born 1969), in the adult entertainment industry
 Talon (surname)
 Talon (bearer bond), a document attached to a bearer bond which entitled the holder to a block of further coupons
 Talon (rural locality), in Russia
 Talon Esports, a professional esports organisation based in Hong Kong
 PSG Talon, a professional League of Legends team
 Talon, Nièvre, a commune in France
 Talon Zipper, US zipper company
 San Antonio Talons, San Antonio, Texas's arena football team, formerly the Tulsa Talons
 The mascot of the Major League Soccer team D.C. United
 Another name for Ogee moulding in woodworking

See also
 Operation Talon (disambiguation), the codename of several military or police operations
 
 Tallon (disambiguation)
 Talion (disambiguation)
 Talen (disambiguation)
 Tallinn, the capital city of Estonia